Krasnoyarsk State Technical University (KSTU) is a public university in the city of Krasnoyarsk, Russia, existed in 1956–2006. KSTU joined the Siberian Federal University.

History
On August 4, 1956, the Council of Ministers of the USSR, by its Decree No. 1043, allowed the opening of the Krasnoyarsk Polytechnic Institute in Krasnoyarsk.

On February 23, 1974, by order of the Ministry of Higher and Secondary Specialized Education of the RSFSR, the Kyzyl branch of the Krasnoyarsk Polytechnic Institute was opened in the Tuva Autonomous Soviet Socialist Republic.

On October 18, 1981, the Krasnoyarsk Civil Engineering Institute separated from the KrPI.

On March 11, 1993, the institute received the status of a technical university and was renamed the Krasnoyarsk State Technical University.

As of 1998, KSTU provided training in 20 areas and 33 specialties in the fields of energy, manufacturing, radio electronics, computer science and computer technology, control systems, auto and air transport, economics and management. KSTU has established close ties with scientific and educational institutions in the United Kingdom, Bulgaria, Hungary, Germany, China, Mongolia, the United States, Taiwan and France. KSTU was a co-founder of the international scientific and educational center "Siberia–Europe".

On November 8, 2006, the Government of the Russian Federation has decided to establish the Siberian Federal University. KSTU became a part of it.

References

Literature 
 Большой энциклопедический словарь Красноярского края [Great Encyclopedic Dictionary of the Krasnoyarsk Krai] / гл. ред. А. П. Статейнов. Красноярск : Буква С, 2010. Т. 2 : [Административно-территориальное деление. Населенные пункты. Предприятия и организации]. p. 192. 515 p. (in Russian).

Universities in Krasnoyarsk Krai
Educational institutions established in 1956
Educational institutions disestablished in 2006
Krasnoyarsk
1956 establishments in Russia